The 2021 LSU Tigers football team represented Louisiana State University in the 2021 NCAA Division I FBS football season. The Tigers played their home games at Tiger Stadium in Baton Rouge, Louisiana, and competed in the Western Division of the Southeastern Conference (SEC). They were led by sixth-year head coach Ed Orgeron, who left the program at the conclusion of the regular season. The Tigers ended their season by playing Kansas State in the Texas Bowl, where they were led by interim head coach Brad Davis.

The 42-20 loss in the Texas Bowl to the Wildcats saddled LSU with its first sub-.500 season since 1999, when a 3-8 record led to the dismissal of coach Gerry DiNardo.

Previous season
The Tigers finished the 2020 season 5–5 vs. an all-SEC schedule to finish in fourth place in the Western Division. LSU announced a self-imposed bowl ban for the 2020 season. The self-imposed bowl ban was enacted due to the ongoing NCAA investigation at LSU.

Schedule

Schedule Source:

Roster

Rankings

Players drafted into the NFL

References

LSU
LSU Tigers football seasons
LSU Tigers football